WDTZ-LP, better known by its brand name Z 98, is a low power FM radio station in the Cincinnati, Ohio market. It broadcasts mostly a '80s-based hit music format but has recently begun playing occasional ’70s & ’90s music.  It is owned by Delhi Public Radio, Inc.

WDTZ-LP is a 501(C)(3) non-profit, community station with most programming done by volunteers.  As such, it relies on donations to help meet expenses.

Station history
In October 2013, Delhi Public Radio applied for the LPFM station on 98.1. They were the only applicant for this license.  On February 19, 2014, a construction permit was granted. Equipment testing began the first week of June 2014. Program testing began on June 15, 2014. On June 24, 2014 the station applied to the FCC for their full license to cover the construction permit. On June 30, 2014, the FCC granted the license.

Format
In an effort to recreate the sound of a top 40 radio station from the 1980s, WDTZ-LP uses bumpers and jingles that were commonly heard on those stations during that time.  The station also tends to play more songs that charted in lower regions of the top 40 chart (and even songs that missed the top 40 chart but charted on the Billboard Hot 100) than most oldies stations rather than playing exclusively gold or recurrent singles.

See also
List of community radio stations in the United States

External links
Z 98 website

DTZ-LP
Community radio stations in the United States
DTZ-LP
Radio stations established in 2014
2014 establishments in Ohio